Mark Beckwith is an English former professional rugby league footballer who played for Whitehaven and Barrow. He made two appearances for Great Britain under-21s in 1986, and also represented Cumbria.

In 1998, he played for amateur club Egremont Rangers in their fourth round Challenge Cup tie against Workington Town, scoring a try in a surprise 18–0 victory over their professional opponents.

References

Living people
Barrow Raiders players
Cumbria rugby league team players
English rugby league players
Great Britain under-21 national rugby league team players
Rugby league hookers
Rugby league players from Cumbria
Whitehaven R.L.F.C. players
Year of birth missing (living people)